The Beautiful Gothic (Leucochlaena oditis) is a Palearctic moth of the family Noctuidae, sub-family Cuculliinae.
It is found in southern Europe and north Africa, with occasional finds on the southern coast of England.

Technical description and variation

L. oditis Hbn. (= hispida H. G., pilosa Bsd., hirta Dup. nec Hbn.) (29 c). Forewing deep olive brown: all the veins whitish; inner and outer lines broadly whitish with a dark line in centre, the first outwardly oblique,the outer outcurved above and oblique below middle, emitting pale tooth-shaped marks along veins to submarginal line which is broad, whitish internally and rufous or brownish externally, toothed between the black marginal lunules; the line is preceded by black wedge-shaped blotches lying between the teeth of outer line; claviform stigma brown, black-edged; upper stigmata pale ochreous, finely outlined with black, the orbicular with the centre reddish; fringe with basal half brown, outer half ochreous; hindwing dull whitish, becoming brownish grey towards termen, with a dark outer line; specimens from the chalk at Portland [South England] are much paler and constitute the aberrations pallida Tutt and obsoleta Tutt; the former pale grey with a faint brown tinge; the costa
whitish; the broad submarginal line white like the fringe; hindwing and fringe almost wholly white; the latter is dull grey with scarcely any paler markings; ab. hispanica ab. nov. (29 c, d) differs in being smaller, yellowerbrown, with all lines, veins, and markings ochreous, not white, except the inner linear edge of the submarginal line; it in distinguished at once by the lower half of outer line being vertical instead of oblique, in a straight line with the inner edge of the reniform. Larva yellowish green or brownish; dorsal and subdorsal lines pale with dark edges; spiracular line broad, yellowish white. The wingspan is 28–36 mm

Biology
The moth flies in September and October.

The larvae feed on grasses.

References

External links

Fauna Europaea
Lepiforum.de

Cuculliinae
Moths described in 1822
Moths of Europe
Taxa named by Jacob Hübner